North Roslyn is a closed rail station along the Oyster Bay Branch of the Long Island Rail Road.

History 
The station was originally opened in 1898 as Wheatley Hills and was renamed North Roslyn in 1901. The station closed on March 16, 1924.

References

External links

Former Long Island Rail Road stations in Nassau County, New York
Long Island Rail Road stations in Nassau County, New York
Railway stations in the United States opened in 1898
Railway stations closed in 1924